The Moulton–Wells House (also known as the Eldora State House and Eldora Vilage) is a historic house in New Smyrna Beach, Florida. It is located west of Eldora Road, and is part of the Canaveral National Seashore. On November 21, 2001, it was added to the U.S. National Register of Historic Places.

References

External links

 Volusia County listings at National Register of Historic Places
 Moulton Wells House at Florida's Office of Cultural and Historical Programs

Houses on the National Register of Historic Places in Volusia County, Florida
Indian River Lagoon
Buildings and structures in New Smyrna Beach, Florida
Colonial Revival architecture in Florida